Allium elmaliense is a species of onion endemic to Antalya Province in southwestern Turkey. It has spherical to egg-shaped bulbs up to 3 cm in diameter. Stipe is up to 30 cm tall. Flowers are fragrant; tepals are white with green midveins.

References

elmaliense
Onions
Endemic flora of Turkey
Plants described in 2004